Valduggia is a comune (municipality) in the Province of Vercelli in the Italian region Piedmont, located about  northeast of Turin and about  north of Vercelli.  
 
Valduggia borders the following municipalities: Boca, Borgosesia, Cellio con Breia, Gargallo, Grignasco, Madonna del Sasso, Maggiora, Pogno, and Soriso.

Notable people
 Gaudenzio Ferrari (about 14711546), painter
 Giovanni Battista Falda (16431678), printmaker
 Giuseppe Mazzola (17481838), painter
 Giuseppe Mortarotti (born 1903), football player

References